Salome (Tolkepaya Yavapai: Wiltaika) is an unincorporated community and census-designated place (CDP) in La Paz County, Arizona, United States. The population was 1,530 at the 2010 census. It was established in 1904 by Dick Wick Hall, Ernest Hall and Charles Pratt, and was named after Pratt's wife, Grace Salome Pratt.

Geography
Salome is located in eastern La Paz County at  (33.763728, -113.608555). U.S. Route 60 runs through the community, leading east  to Wickenburg and west  to Interstate 10 between Brenda and Quartzsite.

Southwest of central Salome is Harcuvar, (Mohave name implying 'there is little sweet water') which has a Kampgrounds of America and RV park.

Demographics

As of the census of 2000, there were 1,690 people, 780 households, and 502 families residing in the CDP. The racial makeup of the CDP was 91.1% White, 0.3% Black or African American, 2.7% Native American, 0.3% Asian, 0.2% Pacific Islander, 3.1% from other races, and 2.3% from two or more races. 18.5% of the population were Hispanic or Latino of any race.

There were 780 households, out of which 16.3% had children under the age of 18 living with them, 57.4% were married couples living together, 3.5% had a female householder with no husband present, and 35.6% were non-families. 28.3% of all households were made up of individuals, and 15.6% had someone living alone who was 65 years of age or older. The average household size was 2.2 and the average family size was 2.6.

In the CDP, the population was spread out, with 17.3% under the age of 18, 3.6% from 18 to 24, 15.9% from 25 to 44, 29.3% from 45 to 64, and 33.8% who were 65 years of age or older. The median age was 57 years. For every 100 females, there were 109.4 males. For every 100 females age 18 and over, there were 109.8 males.

The median income for a household in the CDP was $22,866, and the median income for a family was $24,805. Males had a median income of $23,500 versus $21,786 for females. The per capita income for the CDP was $12,872. About 16.7% of families and 23.3% of the population were below the poverty line, including 32.4% of those under age 18 and 16.1% of those age 65 or over.

Gallery

Pictured are the following images of structures and monuments related to Salome:
 The Salome Hotel – built in 1904 and located at 42370 Vicksburg Road in Salome, Arizona. The building once housed the Kofa Café.
 Stage Stop ruins in Salome
 The Oasis Cafe building – built in 1930 and located at 67600 US Highway 60.
 The Salome Santa Fe Depot warehouse
 Dick Wick Hall's grave marker
 The grave of Dick Wick Hall – the founder of Salome, Arizona is located at the intersection of Center and Hall Streets.
 The Dick Wick Hall house ruins located at the intersection of Center and Hall Streets.
 Old 1915 "Where She Danced" building
 Old 1910 Abandoned Justice Court building
 The Westward Motel – built in 1942 is located at 66915 Avenue C.
 The Little Roadside Chapel – built by Paul and Lora Marks and located at 68630 Salome Rd.
 The 9-11 Memorial – located at 66710 Highway 60. The monument was built honoring the victims of the terrorists’ attacks of September 11, 2001.
 Piece of Steel from the World Trade Towers located in the 9-11 Memorial

Notable person
 Dick Wick Hall, humorist and writer

References

Further reading
 

Census-designated places in La Paz County, Arizona
1905 establishments in Arizona Territory
Cemeteries in Arizona